Glenn Martin Crawford (December 2, 1913 – January 2, 1972) was a Major League Baseball player. Crawford played at least seven games at four different positions: 34 at shortstop, 32 in right field, 14 at second base, and 7 in left field.

External links

Major League Baseball shortstops
Major League Baseball outfielders
St. Louis Cardinals players
Philadelphia Phillies players
Fostoria Red Birds players
Union City Greyhounds players
Duluth Dukes players
Decatur Commodores players
Columbus Red Birds players
Portland Beavers players
Oakland Oaks (baseball) players
Muskegon Clippers players
Elmira Pioneers players
Indianapolis Indians players
Augusta Tigers players
Reidsville Luckies players
Baseball players from Michigan
1913 births
1972 deaths